was a junior college in Zentsūji, Kagawa, Japan, and was part of the Shikoku Gakuin network.

The institute was founded in 1950, became a junior college at 1959, and closed in 2006.

Educational institutions established in 1959
Japanese junior colleges
1959 establishments in Japan